"Lovely Daze" is the second and final single taken from DJ Jazzy Jeff & The Fresh Prince's sixth album, Greatest Hits. The song was produced by Chicago-based producers Hula & K. Fingers and became the duo's last single, released in September 1998. Background vocals by Lidell "NuNu" Townsell & Anthony Stewart.

Track listing
 CD Single
 "Lovely Daze" (T.L.A.C Remix) - 4:23
 "Summertime '98" (Soul Power Remix) - 4:15
 "Lovely Daze" (Candyhill Mix) - 3:59
 "A Touch of Jazz" (Album Version) - 3:40

 12" Vinyl
 "Lovely Daze" (T.L.A.C Remix) - 3:40
 "Lovely Daze" (Candyhill Mix) - 3:59
 "Summertime '98" (Soul Power Remix) - 4:15
 "A Touch of Jazz" (Album Version) - 3:40

References
 

1998 singles
DJ Jazzy Jeff & The Fresh Prince songs
Songs written by Will Smith
Songs written by DJ Jazzy Jeff
1998 songs